Asthenotricha lophopterata is a moth in the family Geometridae. It was described by Achille Guenée in 1858. It is found in Madagascar and Réunion.

References

Moths described in 1858
lophopterata
Moths of Madagascar
Moths of Réunion
Taxa named by Achille Guenée